Matthew Padgett (born 27 March 1982) is an English professional darts player who competes in Professional Darts Corporation (PDC) tournaments.

Career

A bowling alley technician by trade, Padgett joined the PDC in 2010. In June 2010, he qualified for the UK Open. Entering at the Last 128 stage, he defeated John Quantock and Jason Clark before losing to Wayne Jones in the last 64.

In November 2010, Padgett came through a field of over 80 players to earn one of two qualifying spots in the 2011 PDC World Darts Championship. He was, however, defeated by Morihiro Hashimoto by 4 legs to 2 in the preliminary round.

Padgett has earned a full PDC Pro Tour card for the 2011 season.

World Championship results

PDC

 2011: Last 72 (lost to Morihiro Hashimoto 2-4) (legs)

References

External links

 Interview with Matt Padgett on the Darts, Beers and Cheers! website

English darts players
1982 births
Living people
Professional Darts Corporation former tour card holders